The 2019 Antigua Guatemala mayoral election was held on 16 June 2019.

The elections will be held next to the presidential, legislative, municipal and Central American Parliament elections.

The current mayor Susana Asensio is not running for re-election. She does not have the legal requirements to qualify for re-election. Asensio was elected mayor in 2015 with a civic committee called "Antigua en Buenas Manos" (English: Antigua in Good Hands).

Results

References

Elections in Guatemala